Fardis is a city in the Central District of Fardis County, Alborz province, Iran, and is the capital of the county. The city had a population in 2016 of 181,174 people in 58,953 households.

References 

Eshtehard County

Cities in Alborz Province

Populated places in Alborz Province

Populated places in Eshtehard County